Axel Johannes Petersen (14 November 1880 – 23 May 1962) was a Danish athlete.  He competed at the 1908 Summer Olympics in London. In the 100 metres, Petersen took second place in his first round heat with a time of 11.5 seconds.  He did not advance to the semifinals.

References

Sources
 
 
 

1880 births
1962 deaths
Athletes (track and field) at the 1908 Summer Olympics
Olympic athletes of Denmark
Danish male sprinters